Angelic Organics, located in Caledonia, Illinois, is one of the oldest Community Supported Agriculture (CSA) farms in the United States. Angelic Organics has grown produce in accordance with organic and biodynamic principles since 1990. Participating subscribers, known as shareholders, receive a weekly 3/4 bushel box of fresh vegetables and herbs delivered to over 40 Chicago area sites.

Angelic Organics's founder, John Peterson, was the focus of the award winning documentary film The Real Dirt on Farmer John.

References 

Boone County, Illinois
Farms in Illinois
Sustainable agriculture
Anthroposophy